Street Medicine Institute was formed in 2008 by Dr. Jim Withers. The term Street Medicine, in this context, was coined by Dr. Jim Withers who has been one of the leaders in the movement. His program, Operation Safety Net in Pittsburgh, Pennsylvania, has hosted the annual International Street Medicine Symposium in various cities since 2005.

References 

Health charities in the United States
Homelessness charities
International medical and health organizations
Medical and health organizations based in Pennsylvania